USS O-7 (SS-68) was one of 16 O-class submarines built for the United States Navy during World War I.

Description
The O-class submarines were designed to meet a Navy requirement for coastal defense boats. They displaced  on the surface and  submerged. The O-class submarines had a crew of 29 officers and enlisted men.

For surface running, the boats were powered by two  diesel engines, each driving one propeller shaft. When submerged each propeller was driven by a  electric motor. They could reach  on the surface and  underwater.

The boats were armed with four 18-inch (450 mm)  torpedo tubes in the bow. They carried four reloads, for a total of eight torpedoes. The O-class submarines were also armed with a single 3"/50 caliber deck gun.

Construction and career
O-7 was laid down on 14 February 1917 by the Fore River Shipbuilding Company in Quincy, Massachusetts. She was launched on 16 December 1917 sponsored by Mrs. Constance Sears, and commissioned on 4 July 1918 with Lieutenant Commander Frederick C. Sherman, in command. During the final stages of World War I, O-7 operated out of Philadelphia, Pennsylvania, on coastal patrol from Cape Cod to Key West, Florida. On 2 November she departed Newport, Rhode Island, with a 20-sub contingent bound for European waters, however, the  Armistice with Germany was signed before the ships reached the Azores, and they returned to the United States.

In 1919, O-7 reported to the newly established Submarine School at New London, Connecticut, to train there for the next decade. In 1924, she went to Coco Solo for maneuvers and was reclassified a second line submarine on 25 July 1924.  Returning to New London, she reverted to first line on 6 June 1928. In January 1930, she joined her sister ships in a run to Portsmouth, New Hampshire, thence back to New London in February.  After returning from Washington, DC. in July, she continued operations at New London. She sailed to Philadelphia, Pennsylvania, on 23 February 1931 and decommissioned there on 1 July 1931.

After a decade in mothballs, O-7 was recalled to active duty and recommissioned at Philadelphia 12 February 1941.  She reported to New London in May and trained sub crews there until the end of World War II. O-7 was decommissioned on 2 July 1945; was struck from the Naval Vessel Register on 11 July 1945; and sold to North American Smelting Company of Philadelphia on 22 January 1946.

Notes

References

External links
 

United States O-class submarines
World War I submarines of the United States
World War II submarines of the United States
Ships built in Quincy, Massachusetts
1917 ships